Losa may refer to:

People
 Alberto Losa (born 1917), Swiss football player
 Brad De Losa (born 1979), Australian fitter
 Gastón Losa
 Ilse Losa (1913—2006), Portuguese writer and translator
 Isabella Losa
 Pedro Martínez Losa (born 1976), Spanish football manager

Places
 La Losa, Spain
 Losa del Obispo, Spain
 Nuraghe Losa, Italy
 Valle de Losa, Spain

Other
 LOSA Collaborative